Maria Fe Romerica Abunda (born November 8, 1957) is a Filipino politician. She is currently a member of the Philippine House of Representatives representing the Eastern Samar's Lone District from 2019 to 2025. She served as the Mayor of Borongan from 2013 to 2019. She became the first woman to be elected as Eastern Samar representative. She is the sister of television host Boy Abunda.

Political career

Mayor of Borongan (2013–2019)
Abunda became the Mayor of Borongan, the capital city of the province of Eastern Samar, from 2013 to 2016. During her mayoral tenure, she received criticisms regarding her affiliations with political parties.

House of Representatives (2019–2025)

Having been elected on 2019, Abunda represented Eastern Samar's Lone District in the 18th Philippine Congress. After being re-elected in May 2022, she currently represents once again for the 19th Philippine Congress. While in Congress, she authored and co-authored several house bills and republic acts, namely:

Other appointments (2022–present)
Vice-Chairman, Committee on Basic Education And Culture
Vice-Chairman, Committee on Higher And Technical Education
Vice-Chairman, Committee on Poverty Alleviation
Member, Committee on Foreign Affairs
Member, Committee on Health
Member, Committee on Social Services
Member, Committee on Tourism
Member, Committee on Trade And Industry
Member, Committee on Visayas Development
Member, Committee on Women And Gender Equality

References

External links
 Province of Eastern Samar – Provincial Officials easternsamar.gov.ph
 Philippine House of Representatives – Hon. Abunda, Maria Fe R. congress.gov.ph

1957 births
Living people
People from Borongan
PDP–Laban politicians
Members of the House of Representatives of the Philippines
Women members of the House of Representatives of the Philippines
21st-century Filipino women politicians
Women mayors of places in the Philippines